"(It's Just) The Way That You Love Me" is a song recorded by American singer Paula Abdul for her debut album Forever Your Girl (1988). Written and produced solely by producer Oliver Leiber, the song was originally released in its remix form as the second single from the album on August 2, 1988, by Virgin to minor success in the States. Following the breakthrough success of her next three singles, the song was re-released on September 15, 1989, under its original version to commercial success, becoming Abdul's fourth consecutive top three entry on the Billboard Hot 100 and to date, tying with "Straight Up" as her longest charting performance on the chart. The song, however, did not replicate the same success in the UK where it managed to peak at number seventy-four on the UK Singles Chart, thus becoming her lowest charting single in the region to date.

Composition
The song is performed in the key of D minor with a tempo of 120 beats per minute. Abdul's vocals span from A3 to D5.

Chart performance
In June 1988, Forever Your Girl was released, along with the follow-up single "The Way That You Love Me". Virgin and Abdul's producers felt that it was necessary to remix the song for its single release, hence the addition of (It's Just) to the song's title; also, Karyn White's "The Way You Love Me" was out at this time, thus helping to avoid confusion among consumers. The song failed to attract much attention, despite its dance-pop remix. The song stalled at #88 on the Billboard Hot 100 but reached the top 10 of Billboard's R&B chart.

In the UK, "The Way That You Love Me" was also Abdul's second single release,With the Wild Pair Marvin Gunn and Bruce DeShazer AKA Tony Christian on Background Vocals  following "Knocked Out" in 1988. It failed to chart in the Top 100, although after the success of "Straight Up", "Forever Your Girl" and the re-release of "Knocked Out" in 1989, this song was also rereleased but it was not a success. It charted at #86 on 25 November 1989, going on to peak at #74 the following week, becoming Abdul's least successful single in the UK.

In the autumn of 1989 in the US, "The Way That You Love Me" was re-released in its original edit. This time, it became a huge success, peaking at #3 on the Billboard Hot 100. But it peaked one spot higher at #2 on the Radio & Records CHR/Pop Airplay Chart on December 2, 1989, blocked from the top by Milli Vanilli's "Blame It on the Rain". It was subsequently included as the demonstration song on several Casio keyboards (e.g. CT-670 ToneBank Keyboard).

Music video
The song's video was Abdul's first with director David Fincher in July 1988, who would later direct her most successful videos. It consisted of Abdul dancing and singing with male dancers at a photo shoot, while expensive product shots were flashed in and out. It also featured Abdul's first tap dancing sequence, which she would use again in her videos for "Straight Up", "Opposites Attract", and "Forever Your Girl".

A new video was made in August 1989 with the same director and theme for the single's rerelease. It consisted of less dancing and more interaction between Abdul and her material world.

Track listings and formats
US 12"
"The Way That You Love Me" (12" remix)
"The Way That You Love Me" (7" dub)
"The Way That You Love Me" (Houseafire mix)

US cassette
"The Way That You Love Me" (7" Radio edit)
"The Way That You Love Me" (7" dub)

US promo/Euro 5"/3" CD singles
"The Way That You Love Me" (7" Radio edit)
"The Way That You Love Me" (12" remix)
"The Way That You Love Me" (7" dub)
"The Way That You Love Me" (Houseafire mix; on the Euro 3" single, this mix is faded early, at 2:53)

Official mixes
 Album version – 5:21
 LP edit – 4:02 (re-released in 1989 used on Version 2 of video)
 7" radio edit – 4:07
 Single mix – 4:00 (Shorter version of 7", omits spoken part)
 12" extended remix – 6:55
 7" dub – 5:11
 Houseafire Mix – 6:35
 Housefire Edit – 4:42
 Housefire Short Edit – 2:53
 UK Remix – 5:44
 7" Dance Edit – 5:03

Charts

Weekly charts

Original release

Re-release

Year-end charts

References

1988 singles
1989 singles
Paula Abdul songs
Cashbox number-one singles
Music videos directed by David Fincher
Songs written by Oliver Leiber
Virgin Records singles
1988 songs
New jack swing songs